Begone Dull Care is a 1949 visual music animated film directed by Norman McLaren and Evelyn Lambart.

Summary
Using drawn-on-film animation, McLaren and Lambart painted and scratched directly onto film stock to create a visual representation of Oscar Peterson's jazz music. The film was produced by the National Film Board of Canada.

Opening titles 
The film opens with titles in seven languages: English, French, Spanish, Hindi, Italian, Russian, and German.

Awards
 Venice Film Festival, Venice: First Prize, Art Films, 1950
 2nd Canadian Film Awards, Ottawa: Special Award, Experimentation, 1950
 Salerno Film Festival, Salerno, Italy: Honourable Mention, Miscellaneous Film, 1950
 1st Berlin International Film Festival, Berlin: Silver Medal, Documentary Short Film, 1951
 American Federation of Arts and Film Advisory Center Film Festival, Woodstock, New York: Best Experimental Film, 1952
Durban International Film Festival, Durban: First Place, Silver Medal, Experimental, 1954

Legacy
Begone Dull Care was designated and preserved as a "masterwork" by the Audio-Visual Preservation Trust of Canada, a charitable non-profit organization dedicated to promoting the preservation of Canada's audio-visual heritage. It also won a special Genie Award for experimental filmmaking.

The Canadian electronic music duo Junior Boys named their 2009 album Begone Dull Care for the film, which was reported to have influenced the conception and creation of the music.

References

External links

 

1949 films
Quebec films
Animated films without speech
Canadian animated short films
Films directed by Norman McLaren
Visual music
Jazz films
Canadian Screen Award-winning films
Drawn-on-film animated films
National Film Board of Canada animated short films
1940s animated short films
1949 animated films
Animated musical films
Canadian musical films
1940s Canadian films